Visa requirements for Ukrainian citizens are administrative entry restrictions by the authorities of other states placed on citizens of Ukraine. As of 22 December 2022, Ukrainian citizens could travel to 144 countries and territories without a travel visa or with a visa on arrival, ranking the Ukrainian passport 35th in terms of travel freedom, according to the Henley Passport Index 2022.

Visa requirements map

Travel documents of Ukrainian citizens
For traveling to certain countries, Ukrainians do not need to use a passport, as they may use their Ukrainian identity card.

General information 
Documents which give the right to leave Ukraine and to enter Ukraine and certify the identity of a citizen of Ukraine while staying abroad are:

 passport of a citizen of Ukraine for traveling abroad (citizens of Ukraine can use a general-purpose passport for travel to Georgia and Turkey when arriving directly);
 diplomatic passport;
 service passport;
 travel document of the child;
 seaman's identify card.

It's important to know, that the special rules of arriving in a particular country should be studied carefully. Thus, in most countries that do not require visas or issue visas, upon arrival you must have a passport, which is valid for at least 3 months from arrival in that country.

Regardless of the entry regime, foreign border services may require documents confirming the purpose of the visit and the availability of sufficient financial resources for travel.

The visa-free regime with other countries does not give the right to work in them. Failure to comply with this rule may result in a fine with subsequent deportation.

Some countries may charge a fee for entry or exit.

In cases where a visa is issued upon arrival, it may be necessary to have 1-2 color passport photographs of the person crossing the border.

For visa-free travel to the countries of the Schengen zone, you need only a biometric passport. Owners of passports of the old model need a visa or residence permit in one of the countries of the Schengen zone.

Europe 
From June 11, 2017 Ukrainians with biometric passports can travel to countries part of the Schengen Area visa-free for up to 90 days.

Albania and Bosnia and Herzegovina have a visa-free regime with Ukraine (entry is possible for up to 30 days upon presentation of a passport (to Serbia, Montenegro and North Macedonia - up to 90 days). Other EU countries, that are not part of the Schengen area, also allow Ukrainians to enter with biometric passports (Bulgaria, Cyprus, Romania).

In response to the 2022 Russian invasion of Ukraine, Ireland decided to lift visa requirements for Ukrainian citizens.

Crimea 
Crimea and parts of Donetsk, Luhansk, Zaporizhzhia and Kherson regions due to the Russia's war against Ukraine are presently illegally occupied by Russian Federation. All previous laws and regulations of crossing the borders and moving within this regions are temporarily disabled.

Recent 
Recently visa requirements for Ukrainian citizens were lifted by Paraguay (May 2009), Montenegro (October 2010), Hong Kong (November 2010), Israel (February 2011), Argentina (October 2011), Brunei (2 November 2011), Bosnia and Herzegovina (November 2011), Serbia (December 2011), Brazil (December 2011), Panama (August 2013), Turkey (August 2012), Chile (October 2015), Indonesia (March 2016), Costa Rica (December 2016), Saint Kitts and Nevis (January 2017), Albania (April 2017), the Schengen Area countries (11 June 2017), Qatar (August 2017), United Arab Emirates (31 December 2017), Kuwait (18 April 2018), New Caledonia (20 May 2018), Uruguay (15 February 2019), Thailand (14 April 2019), Marshall Islands (12 February 2020), Colombia (17 April 2020), Grenada (1  March 2021), Tunisia and Ireland (25 February 2022), Gibraltar (3 March 2022).

Visa requirements

Pre-approved visas pick-up
Pre-approved visas can be picked up on arrival in the following countries instead in embassy or consulate.

Dependent, disputed, or restricted territories

Visa requirements for Ukrainian citizens for visits to various territories, disputed areas, partially recognized countries and restricted zones:

Limitations

Visitors with passport stamp of Israel are not allowed to enter a number of countries because of the Arab League boycott of Israel.

As a result of the First Nagorno-Karabakh War between Azerbaijan and Armenia, Azerbaijan refuses entry to passport-holders of Ukraine and any other country if they are of Armenian descent. It also strictly refuses entry to foreigners in general whose passport shows evidence of entry into the self-proclaimed Nagorno-Karabakh Republic, immediately declaring them permanent personae non gratae.

Vaccination
Many African countries, including Angola, Benin, Burkina Faso, Cameroon, Central African Republic, Chad, Democratic Republic of the Congo, Republic of the Congo, Côte d'Ivoire, Equatorial Guinea, Gabon, Ghana, Guinea, Liberia, Mali, Mauritania, Niger, Rwanda, São Tomé and Príncipe, Senegal, Sierra Leone, Uganda, Zambia require all incoming passengers to have a current International Certificate of Vaccination. Some other countries require vaccination only if the passenger is coming from an infected area.

Passport validity
Many countries require passport validity of no less than 6 months and one or two blank pages.

See also

 Visa policy of Ukraine
 Ukrainian passport
 Foreign relations of Ukraine

References and notes
References

Notes

Ukraine
Foreign relations of Ukraine